The Pakistan Wolfpak are a professional American football team based in Peshawar, Pakistan. The Wolfpaks are one of the first eight franchises of the Elite Football League of India (EFLI) and compete in its inaugural season in 2012 as a member of the West Division.

It is also the first ever American football team in Pakistan.

References

Elite Football League of India
American football in Pakistan
American football teams established in 2011
Sport in Peshawar
2011 establishments in Pakistan